Alfredo Hilario Isidro del Mazo González (31 December 1943 – 10 January 2019) was a Mexican politician affiliated with the Institutional Revolutionary Party.

Early life 
He was the Governor of the State of Mexico from 1981 to 1986 and the Secretary of Energy during part of President Miguel de la Madrid's national government.

In 1997 he represented the PRI in first election for the Head of Government of the Federal District, but lost to Cuauhtémoc Cárdenas of the Party of the Democratic Revolution.

He also served briefly as Deputy of the LIX Legislature of the Mexican Congress as a plurinominal representative in 2003.

References

1943 births
2019 deaths
People from Toluca
National Autonomous University of Mexico alumni
Mexican Secretaries of Energy
Governors of the State of Mexico
Members of the Chamber of Deputies (Mexico)
Institutional Revolutionary Party politicians
Deputies of the LIX Legislature of Mexico